East Ferry is a community in the Canadian province of Nova Scotia, located in Digby County on Digby Neck.

References
East Ferry on Destination Nova Scotia

Communities in Digby County, Nova Scotia
General Service Areas in Nova Scotia